Jean-Marie Girault (9 February 1926 – 1 May 2016) was a French politician and former mayor of Caen.

See also
 List of mayors of Caen

References

1926 births
2016 deaths
People from Pont-l'Évêque, Calvados
Politicians from Normandy
Independent Republicans politicians
Union for French Democracy politicians
French Senators of the Fifth Republic
Mayors of Caen
University of Caen Normandy alumni
Senators of Calvados (department)
20th-century French lawyers